The 2014–15 ISU Challenger Series was held from September to December 2014. It was the inaugural season of a group of senior-level international figure skating competitions ranked below the Grand Prix series. Each event included a minimum of three disciplines (men's singles, ladies' singles, pair skating, and ice dancing).

Eleven competitions were selected in June 2014. The Triglav Trophy dropped out by October 10, 2014, resulting in a series composed of ten events.

Schedule 
The 2014–15 series comprised the following events:

Medal summary

Men

Ladies

Pairs

Ice dance

Challenger Series rankings
The ISU Challenger Series rankings were formed by combining the two highest final scores of each skater or duo.

Men

Ladies

Pairs

Ice Dance

Top scores in Challenger series

Men 
Best total score

Ladies 
Best total score

Pairs 
Best total score

Ice dance 
Best total score

References

External links 
 ISU Challenger Series at the International Skating Union

2014 in figure skating
ISU Challenger Series